Michael Forster may refer to:
Michael Neil Forster (born 1957), American philosopher 
Michael Forster (artist) (1907–2002), Anglo-Canadian abstract artist

See also
Michael Foster (disambiguation)